Gustav Adolf Church may refer to:

Gustav Adolf Church, Borås
Gustav Adolf Church, Habo Municipality
Gustav Adolf Church, Hagfors Municipality
Gustav Adolf Church, Helsingborg
Gustav Adolf Church, Iisalmi
Gustav Adolf Church, Liverpool  
Gustav Adolf Church, Viby
Gustav Adolf Church, Sundsvall
 Gustaf Adolf Church, Stockholm
 Gustav Adolf Church, Hamburg (German. Gustaf-Adolfs-Kirche)

Other
 Gustav Adolf Chapel at Schwedenstein, Lützen
 Gustav Church
 Hartola Church (Fi. Hartolan kirkko, Sw: Gustav Adolfs kyrka)
 Karl Gustav Church

See also
 Gustav Church (disambiguation)
 Gustav Adolf Parish
 Gustavus Adolphus